Luigi Roncaglia (born 10 June 1943) is a retired Italian cyclist. He competed as an amateur track racer in the team pursuit at the 1964 and 1968 Olympics and at the world championships of 1965–1968, winning a medal on all occasions. He then became a professional road cyclist and won a six-day race in Melbourne in 1970.

References

Italian male cyclists
1943 births
Olympic silver medalists for Italy
Olympic bronze medalists for Italy
Cyclists at the 1964 Summer Olympics
Cyclists at the 1968 Summer Olympics
Olympic cyclists of Italy
Olympic medalists in cycling
Living people
Cyclists from the Province of Mantua
Medalists at the 1964 Summer Olympics
Medalists at the 1968 Summer Olympics